One Eye Peak is a mountain located at Princess Louisa Inlet. One Eye Peak is part of the Pacific Ranges of the Coast Mountains in southwestern British Columbia, Canada. When Thomas F. Hamilton build his resort called the Malibu Club at the entrance of Princess Louisa Inlet he named the mountain after himself - Mt. Hamilton.  The mountain is typically referred to by its English title of a Sechelt First Nation translation "TUHK-OHSS" referring to "Old One Eye" and is the protector of the inlet.

External links
 CM_C2308 Fraser River to N.E.Pt. of Texada Island including Howe Sound and Jervis Inlet 'Annotated'  1863.02.16 1865.08

Gallery

References

One-thousanders of British Columbia
Pacific Ranges
New Westminster Land District